Oligodentatus is a genus of mites in the family Digamasellidae. There are at least four described species in Oligodentatus.

Species
These four species belong to the genus Oligodentatus:
 Oligodentatus certus Barilo, 1989
 Oligodentatus fimetarius (Karg, 1965)
 Oligodentatus shcherbakae Barilo, 1989
 Oligodentatus tridentatus Shcherbak & Bregetova, 1980

References

Acari